Scharnebeck is a municipality in the district of Lüneburg, in Lower Saxony, Germany. The Scharnebeck twin ship lift on the Elbe Lateral Canal is in the municipality.

References